Piero (Pierre) Maquignaz (pron. fr. ) from Valtournenche was an Italian cross-country skier and military patrol runner, who competed in the 1920s and 1930s.

Biography 
Maquignaz won the 18 kilometres event of the 1926 Italian men's championships of cross-country skiing, and placed second in the following year. At the 1928 Winter Olympics in St. Moritz, he was member of the Italian military patrol team (demonstration event). In 1933, he was member of the winner team at the first Mezzalama Trophy event.

External links 
 Angelo Elli: http://www.angeloelli.it/alpinisti/file/Maquignaz%20Piero.html

References 

Year of birth missing
Year of death missing
Italian military patrol (sport) runners
Italian male cross-country skiers
Olympic biathletes of Italy
Military patrol competitors at the 1928 Winter Olympics
Sportspeople from Aosta Valley